Blakeslee is a surname. Notable people with the surname include:

 Albert Francis Blakeslee, botanist
 Dennis A. Blakeslee (1856–1933), American politician
 Dick Blakeslee, professor
 Donald Blakeslee, fighter pilot
 George Hubbard Blakeslee, historian
 Howard W. Blakeslee (1880–1952), American journalist
 Mermer Blakeslee, writer in the Catskills, New York
 Sam Blakeslee, current California State Senator (R-San Luis Obispo)
 Susanne Blakeslee, voice actress

Places in the United States
 Blakeslee, Ohio
 Blakeslee, Pennsylvania

Stadiums
Blakeslee Stadium, Mankato, Minnesota